Suryapet revenue division (or Suryapet division) is an administrative division in the Suryapet district of the Indian state of Telangana. It is one of the 2 revenue divisions in the district which consists of 14 mandals under its administration. Suryapet is the divisional headquarters of the division.

Administration 
The mandals in the division are:

See also 
List of revenue divisions in Telangana
List of mandals in Telangana

References 

Revenue divisions in Suryapet district